Salix chilensis, the Chilean pencil willow, is a species of willow native to Mexico, Central America and South America, described by  Molina in 1782. Some authorities consider it conspecific with Salix humboldtiana, which Willdenow described in 1805.

References

chilensis
Plants described in 1782